The 1926 Bothwell by-election was held on 26 March 1926.  The by-election was held due to the death of the incumbent Labour MP, John Robertson.  It was won by the Labour candidate Joseph Sullivan.

Result

References

Bothwell by-election
1920s elections in Scotland
Politics of South Lanarkshire
Bothwell by-election
By-elections to the Parliament of the United Kingdom in Scottish constituencies
Bothwell by-election